This is a list of commercial banks in Djibouti

 For-profit banks
 Bank of Deposit and Credit Djibouti
 Bank of Africa Red Sea
 Bank for Trade and Industry Red Sea
 Commercial Bank of Djibouti
 CAC International Bank 
 Exim Bank of Djibouti
 International Investment Bank
 Silk Road International Bank

 Islamic Banks
 East Africa Bank (Djibouti)
 Saba African Bank 
 Salaam African Bank

See also
 Central Bank of Djibouti
 List of banks in Africa
 List of banks in the Arab world
 List of companies based in Djibouti

References

External links
Website of Central Bank of Djibouti (French)

 
Banks
Djibouti
Djibouti